The National Football League (NFL) is a professional American football league in the United States and the highest professional level of American football in the world. It was formed in 1920 as the American Professional Football Association (APFA) before adopting its current name for the 1922 season. After initially determining champions through end-of-season standings, a playoff system was implemented in 1933 that culminated with the NFL Championship Game. Following an agreement to merge the NFL with the rival American Football League (AFL) in 1966, the Super Bowl was first held in 1967 to determine a champion between the best teams from the two leagues and has remained as the final game of each NFL season since the merger was completed in 1970. After the merger, all AFL Championship Games and records were included in NFL record books, and the teams have been divided between the American Football Conference (AFC) and the National Football Conference (NFC).

Since 2002, the league has consisted of 32 teams based across the United States. Each NFL season since 2021 has started with a three-week preseason in August, followed by the 18-week regular season which runs from early September to early January, with each team playing 17 games and having one bye week. Following the conclusion of the regular season, seven teams from each conference (four division winners and three wild card teams) advance to the playoffs, a single-elimination tournament that culminates in the Super Bowl, which is contested in February and is played between the AFC and NFC conference champions.

Early years (1920–1932)
Early championships between 1920 to 1932 were awarded to the team with the best won-lost record, initially rather haphazardly, as some teams played more or fewer games than others, or scheduled games against non-league, amateur or collegiate teams; this led to the 1920 title being determined during a league meeting after the season, the 1921 title being decided on a controversial tiebreaker, a disputed 1925 title, and the scheduling of an impromptu 1932 indoor playoff game.

1933–1959
In 1933, the teams were divided between the Eastern Division and Western Division. This became the American and National conferences in 1950 after absorbing the rival All-America Football Conference (AAFC), then the Eastern and Western conferences in 1953. The two division/conference regular season champions then played in the NFL Championship Game. If two teams tied for the division/conference championship at the end of the regular season, then a one-game playoff was played to determine who would advance to the NFL Championship Game.

War with the AFL (1960–1969)
The rival American Football League (AFL) began play in 1960 with its own Eastern and Western divisions and AFL Championship Game. Following an agreement to merge the NFL with AFL, the Super Bowl was first held at the conclusion of the 1966 season to determine a champion between the best teams from the two leagues. The NFL then established a four-team postseason tournament in 1967, and the AFL did the same in 1969.

Modern era (1970–present)
The AFL–NFL merger between the two leagues was completed before the 1970 season. The teams were divided between the American Football Conference (AFC) and the National Football Conference (NFC). The two conference playoff champions then played in the Super Bowl to determine the NFL champion.

Future seasons

Listed below is the current schedule of division match-ups for the next few upcoming regular seasons, based on the three-year intra-conference and four-year inter-conference rotations in place since 2021. In each year, besides the home and away games against their three division rivals, all four teams in each division listed at the top will play one game against all four teams in both of the divisions to which it has been assigned — one from the AFC, the other from the NFC. Each team will also play an additional inter-conference "17th game" from another division based on the prior season's standings, with the AFC team hosting it in odd years and the NFC team hosting it in even years. This table also lists the sites of the regular season games that are planned to be held outside the United States as part of the NFL International Series, as well as the sites and US TV networks of the corresponding Super Bowls.

Current listing of International Series games are based on extant contracts. The league stated in 2017 that it was using "inventory management" to wait until current agreements expire before potentially expanding the series, particularly into Germany. The current agreement with Tottenham Hotspur Stadium in London runs through 2027. Germany will host four games between 2022 and 2025, two each in Allianz Arena, Munich and Deutsche Bank Park, Frankfurt, starting with Munich.

See also 
 Lists of National Football League team seasons
 Timeline of the National Football League
 American Football League (1926) (AFL I)
 1926 American Football League season
 American Football League (1936) (AFL II)
 1936 American Football League season
 1937 American Football League season
 American Football League (1940) (AFL III)
 1940 American Football League season
 1941 American Football League season
 All-America Football Conference (AAFC)
 1946 AAFC season
 1947 AAFC season
 1948 AAFC season
 1949 AAFC season
 AAFC–NFL merger
 Ohio League
 New York Pro Football League
 Western Pennsylvania Professional Football Circuit
 Anthracite League
 Midwest Football League (1935–1940)

References
General

 
 
 
 
 
 

Specific

 
Seasons